Mike Kalambay (born April 21, 1978) is a Congolese gospel singer-songwriter whose origin is from Kinshasa, Democratic Republic of the Congo. Mike Kalambay also founded Mike Kalambay & Shekina Music.

Early life 
Mike Kalambay was born on April 21, 1978 in Kinshasa. His parents are Joseph Kabamuanishi and Monique Ngola. He spent his childhood in Mbuji-Mayi. He has two siblings.

Career 
In 1994, Mike was baptized at the Cité Béthel Church of the Apostle Emmanuel Mbiye, Moise Mbiye's father at the age of 16. He started his musical career by singing in a youth church choir "Les étoiles de Louange" which literally means "The stars of Praise" where he met many future Congolese gospel singers including Moise Mbiye, Sandra Mbuyi and others too. The Congolese people noticed Mike's young talent for the first time next to Thomas Lokofe when he released two albums, "Nzambe na Elikya" and "Je lève mes yeux" in 2000. He was also featured in Marie Misamu's hit album, "Mystére du Voile - 100% Adoration" in the song "Eh Yahweh".

Mike launched his debut album, Jesus "mon tout" in 2005 with Jimmy's Productions, after singing for Thomas Lofoke. It was well welcomed both locally in Kinshasa and internationally, with a particular hit, Ngolu. The record was a commercial success for him, and he was nominated for Ndule Awards for his work. From this album, the group Shekina Music was born. With Shekina Music, Mike released his 2nd album, "1 jour..." which literally means "One day...", in 2007, being produced by Kin-Express Productions. This album also featured the future singer Sandra Mbuyi and was the lead singer for the track "Kumama Yahwe". In 2008, Shekina Music, with Mike Kalambay, toured for the first time in France at the LSC hall on 144 Av. du Président Wilson, Saint-Denis, Île-de-France.

In 2009, Mike Kalambay and Shekina Music released another album with Kin-Express Productions, "Dans Ta Présence - Vol. 1". The album was another success with other hits including Bonganga, Nsenda, and Mokonzi Na Nga. A few months later on December 5, Mike Kalambay and Shekina Music toured in Lubumbashi to perform live with their greatest hits. Three years later, Volume 2 of Dans Ta Présence was released with songs such as Mal a L'aise and Ma Louange where released.

In 2014, Mike left Kin-Express Productions and made his own, MK Productions. With this new company he released a new album with Shekina Music, "Je suis une Étoile" the same year. In 2017, Mike Kalambay hosted the Mike Kalambay Concert Boat Ride on July 14. In 2019, Mike Kalambay released "Mon avocat" and was nominated for the Ndule Awards and the 50th anniversary of The Churches of Revival. In 2020, he released his top single, "C'est ton jour" in July. Mike also performed at Mungu wa Maajabu with Deborah Lukalu in which Mercy Chinwo had attended.

Personal life 
Mike Kalambay had a wife, Penielle Tshibasu Kalambay (Nsambu and now Sambu) and the couple has two children, Shaddai and Zion Kalambay, which both names come from Zion and Shaddai, which are from The Bible.  They divorced in 2019.

Awards and nominations

Discography

Albums 

 2005: Jesus "mon tout"
2007: Un jour...
 2009: Dans Ta Presence Vol.1
 2012: Dans Ta Presence Vol.2
 2015: Je suis une Étoile
 2018: Kumama
 2019: Mon Avocat

Live albums 

 2011: Mega Celebration
 2012: Live Acoustics Dans Ta Presence

Singles and Eps 

 2019: Congo Uni
 2020: C'est ton jour
 2021: Molongi (ft. Team Balongi)

Live tours 

 Maximum Celebration (Lubumbashi on November 13, 2017)
 Mike Kalambay Concert Boat Ride (July 14)

References 

Democratic Republic of the Congo gospel singers
Democratic Republic of the Congo songwriters
21st-century Democratic Republic of the Congo male singers
1987 births
Living people